Capital Country was the name of one of  the sixteen tourism regions of New South Wales, Australia. This geographical division is made for improving commerce, specifically tourism, in the state.

The Capital area is one of the oldest settled areas of NSW and is touted for its convenience; it is the area enveloping Canberra, the nation's capital, and is close to Sydney.  It encompasses the Southern Highlands and the Southern Tablelands.  The towns and villages in Capital Country range from sophisticated to quaint; their surrounding areas are mostly rural.  Capital country is known for historical venues, antiques and established open gardens, and the landmarks of Canberra.

The major cities and towns are:

 Bundanoon
 Bungendore
 Canberra
 Crookwell
 Marulan
 Mittagong
 Moss Vale
 Queanbeyan
 Goulburn
 Robertson
 Yass
 Young

Some permanent attractions and events in Capital Country are:

 International Cricket Hall of Fame in Bowral
 Brigadoon in Bundanoon
 Bungendore Village Square
Garden Ramble, Bundanoon
 Kennerton Green one of Australia's most famous gardens, in Mittagong.
 Trail Ride, Tallong

References 

Regions of New South Wales